Yorkville Village is a shopping mall in Toronto, Ontario, Canada. It is located in the Yorkville neighbourhood, along Avenue Road, north of Bloor Street. Prior to its redevelopment which concluded on January 25, 2016, it was known as Hazelton Lanes.

History
It was positioned as a luxury shopping centre and attracted some prestigious retailers.

The shopping complex was expanded to triple its previous size in 1988/1989. In 1991, a six-storey condominium containing 71 units was built by the same developer, situated behind the mall with the address 77 Avenue Road. Despite different entrances, the mall and condo shared utilities, the parking garage and some core services. The mall and condo were set up as separate legal corporations, with contracts governing how they interact.

Hazelton Lanes began to experience difficult times in the early 1990s with the recession that gripped Toronto and much of Canada. Many of the upscale stores in Hazelton Lanes closed their doors, and some of them moved to the Mink Mile along Bloor Street. Brick-work on parts of the complex's exterior fell into disrepair.

Redevelopment
The shopping complex was bought by First Capital Realty in 2011. The corporation spent  to redevelop Yorkville Village. The redevelopment added  to the existing  of space and replaced all mechanical systems. The rebuild has added an Equinox Fitness as its second anchor, which opened its doors on February 3, 2016. The mall continues to be anchored by Whole Foods Market, which has remained throughout the renovation project. Along the Avenue Road frontage, a new double-height glass facade was added. The mall also added an entrance from Yorkville Avenue.

Controversy
First Capital's renovation of Hazelton Lanes led to conflict and lawsuits with the condominium corporation that runs the residential units. In one instance when First Capital needed to shut down electricity for renovations, several residents started a sit-in protest at the construction office which forced First Capital to back down, which was known in the community as the “Yom Kippur Rebellion”.

References

External links
Yorkville Village official website

Shopping malls in Toronto
Shopping malls established in 1976